is a former Japanese football player.

Club career
Saeki was born in Tama on December 18, 1977. Through Verdy Kawasaki (later Tokyo Verdy) youth, after graduating from Kokushikan University, he joined Júbilo Iwata in 2000. However he could hardly play in the match, he moved to Vissel Kobe in 2001. At Vissel, he played many matches as defensive midfielder. However the club was relegated to J2 League end of 2005 season and he moved to Omiya Ardija in 2006. However he could hardly play in the match and he moved to Avispa Fukuoka on loan in June 2006. He returned to Ardija in 2007 and he moved to JEF United Chiba in 2009. In 2010, he moved to J2 League club Tokyo Verdy he played in the youth days. He retired end of 2012 season.

National team career
In August 1993, Saeki was selected Japan U-17 national team for 1993 U-17 World Championship, but he did not play in the match.

Club statistics

References

External links

1977 births
Living people
Kokushikan University alumni
People from Tama, Tokyo
Association football people from Tokyo Metropolis
Japanese footballers
J1 League players
J2 League players
Júbilo Iwata players
Vissel Kobe players
Omiya Ardija players
Avispa Fukuoka players
JEF United Chiba players
Tokyo Verdy players
Association football midfielders